Leopoldo Longanesi (30 August 1905  27 September 1957) was an Italian journalist, publicist, screenplayer, playwright, writer, and publisher. Longanesi is mostly known in his country for his satirical works on Italian society and people. He also founded the eponymous publishing house in Milan in 1946 and was a mentor-like figure for Indro Montanelli: journalist, historian, and founder of Il Giornale, one of Italy's biggest newspapers.

Between 1927 and 1950, he published several magazines, including L’Italiano (1926), Omnibus (1937), and Il Borghese (1950), the last of which is a cultural and satirical weekly paper with conservative orientation. Longanesi described himself as a "cultural anarchist", and he headed a popular right-wing group, which embraced conservatism, agrarian virtues, anti-democracy, and nostalgic post-fascism after World War II.

Longanesi was an elegant and refined cartoonist who wrote several books of memoirs, characterised by a ruthless streak and Italian fascist nostalgic accents (In piedi e seduti, Una vita, and Ci salveranno le vecchie zie?).

Biography

Early life and career
Born in Bagnacavallo, Leo was the son of Paolo Longanesi, director of a gunpowder factory in Lugo, and Angela Marangoni, who came from a local, wealthy landowner family. In 1911, when Leo was six, the Longanesi family moved to Bologna, where, in keeping with the family's affluence, Leo attended the most prestigious school and learned French at Galvani High School. In 1920, Leo wrote his first printed sheet, Il Marchese, at the age of 15. He then wrote in the monthly magazines of Zibaldone dei giovani (1921), Il Toro (1923), and Il Dominio (1924), his youth and writing style catching attention. After high school, Longanesi earned a bachelor's degree in law at the University of Bologna. 

After university, Longanesi developed his social circles by joining the city's worldly elite, literary cafés, and nighthawk pubs. He became friends with leading intellectuals like Galvano Della Volpe, Giorgio Morandi and Vincenzo Cardarelli, and with young rising politicians like Leandro Arpinati, Dino Grandi and Italo Balbo. During this time, Longanesi developed his interest in politics and began collaborating with L'Assalto, a Fascist newspaper in Bologna, in 1924. In the same year, he met Mino Maccari, a famous painter, who introduced him to Rome's socialite circles. With Maccari and popular writer Curzio Malaparte, Longanesi began a cultural movement called Strapaese (literally "great country"), which believed Italian Fascism to be the bearer of rural traditions and patriotic virtues.

Living between Rome and Bologna, Longanesi worked with the magazine Il Selvaggio from 1925 to 1929, and created a weekly magazine L'Italiano from 1926 to 1942, headquartered first in Bologna and then in Rome, with Maccari, American playwright Henry Furst, and writer Giovanni Comisso, former legionnaire of Fiume with Gabriele D'Annunzio. At this time, Benito Mussolini was establishing his police state, banning opposition parties, and imposing a cult of personality based on his figure (the Duce) and the National Fascist Party, the only legal party. Longanesi and his collaborators grew close to the new regime, and started a cultural debate on the relationship between arts and fascism. In 1926, Longanesi wrote his first great work, the "Vade-mecum of the perfect Fascist". The book expresses, with the motto "Mussolini ha sempre ragione", a mix of adoration and caricature of Mussolini's dictatorship. During Mussolini's dictatorship (1926 – 1943), Longanesi was both loyal and critical to Fascism, and was ironic about the Battle for Grain (marshes' recovery policy), the mystification of the Ancient Rome, and imperialist dreams of Africa.

Under Fascism
In 1927, Longanesi created his first publishing house L'Italiano Editions (property of L'Italiano magazine), and published works of Fascist writers who were critical of the regime, such as Malaparte, Riccardo Bacchelli, Vincenzo Cardarelli, and Antonio Baldini, and Telesio Interlandi, who later became a major supporter of the racial laws (1938) against the Jews. The following year, Longanesi purchased the publishing house from Malaparte and later acquired the magazine La Voce, which was founded by conservative journalist Giuseppe Prezzolini in 1919. In 1929, Longanesi ran as a candidate for the general election (which presented only the Fascist Party), but was not elected. In July that year, Longanesi was hired to direct L'Assalto, which he managed until he resigned in 1931. His dismissal was because of a strong and irreverent piece on Senator Giuseppe Tanari, financer of the squadrismo (literally "squadronism"), a radical tendency inside Fascism, members of which attacked, assaulted, and sometimes killed political dissidents. Longanesi was prompted to write the article by an incident in May 1931, when he attended a performance of conductor Arturo Toscanini at the Bologna Communal Theatre, also attended by Galeazzo Ciano, Mussolini's son-in-law, and Arpinati, Longanesi's old friend. At the end of the piece, Ciano and Arpinati called on Toscanini to play Giovinezza, a popular song among the Fascists. When Toscanini refused the request, Ciano and Arpinati left the theatre disappointed, and radical Fascists assaulted Toscanini afterwards for his dissent. Longanesi was erroneously believed to be the first one to slap him, as there was an article against the conductor's refusal the following day.

In May 1932, Longanesi moved with his parents and grandparents to Rome and bought an elegant house in Corso Vittorio Emanuele II. He also moved L'Italiano and Il Selvaggio to the capital. Both magazines were in decline and Longanesi directed them almost alone. Despite his criticisms, Longanesi was chosen by the regime to organize a literary exhibition on Mussolini for the 10th anniversary of the March on Rome, which opened on 28 October 1932. After the start of the Second Italo-Ethiopian War in 1935, Longanesi became the chief of propaganda. Longanesi requested to direct a big newspaper in return for his services to Fascism, but was refused by the regime, which feared that new magazines and papers, especially under direction of critics of the dictatorship, would undermine the Fascists' strict control over the press. However, Longanesi's connection with Mussolini's son Vittorio allowed him to work for Cinema, a magazine of film criticism, in September 1936. He was fired a month later for an unpleasant photographic piece on the regime.

On 3 April 1937, Longanesi created a new magazine, Omnibus, an illustrated news magazine on literature and arts, later described as the "father of Italian magazines", especially for his use of photographs and images. The magazine was published by Angelo Rizzoli (save for the first six months by Arnoldo Mondadori), and presented notable and rising journalists and artists like Indro Montanelli, Alberto Moravia, Vitaliano Brancati, Ennio Flaiano, Mario Soldati, Mario Pannunzio, Arrigo Benedetti, and Alberto Savinio. Despite the magazine's immediate success, Omnibus was forced to close on 2 February 1939 by the Ministry of Popular Culture (Minculpop), apparently without reason but probably for collaborations to the magazine by Jewish intellectuals like Moravia and anti-fascists like Pannunzio. However, Longanesi was appointed as its technical-artistic consultant by Minculpop itself in 1940. At the same time, he was also chosen by Rizzoli to direct a book series, Il sofà delle Muse, and published successful works like The Tartar Steppe (1940), Don Giovanni in Sicily (1941) and The Truth about the Motta Affair (1937, reedited in 1941).

Second World War
On 10 June 1940, Italy declared war against France and the United Kingdom, in alliance with Nazi Germany and other Fascist-inspired nations of the Axis Powers. Despite initial popular enthusiasm for the Italian entrance into the Second World War, Longanesi was skeptical, thinking that it would be the ruin of Italy. Despite his personal beliefs, and remaining faithful to his controversial and eclectic nature, Longanesi chose to stay loyal to the Fascist regime, worked for Primato magazine, directed by former Public Education Minister Giuseppe Bottai, and invented war slogans like "Taci! Il nemico ti ascolta", "La patria si serve anche facendo la sentinella ad un bidone di benzina" and "Una pistola puntata contro l'Italia". After the losing the Greco-Italian War in 1941 and the Tunisian Campaign in 1942, Italy fell into crisis and became more subjected to Germany.

On 25 July 1943, a coup d'état took place against Mussolini to overthrow the Fascist regime. Longanesi, Pannunzio and Benedetti wrote a piece celebrating the apparent return of freedom and hope for Italy's retreat from war. The new Prime Minister Pietro Badoglio, however, secretly signed the armistice of Cassibile with Allied Powers on 3 September 1943, while all of Italy was directly under German military influence. On 8 September, with a proclamation, Pietro Badoglio announced the switching allegiances from the Axis to the Allies, after which he fled to Brindisi with the royal family and the government, leaving military and public authorities without orders. Italy separated into a German-occupied north and an Allied-occupied south. On 16 September, Longanesi fled to the south of Rome with his friends Mario Soldati, Steno, and Riccardo Freda, and arrived at Vinchiaturo on 29 September. On 1 October, Longanesi moved to Naples, where, along with Steno and Soldati, he collaborated with Allied authorities on an anti-fascist propaganda FM radio named White Star. However, Longanesi quickly grew critical of the new anti-fascist political class, which he found composed of old opportunists and new ambitious figures united in a climate of political chameleonism. On 5 June 1944, Rome was finally liberated, and Longanesi returned to the capital on 1 July, writing the comedy Il suo cavallo, a mockery of Mussolini, similar to Shakespeare's Richard III.

Post-war, political activism and death
In January 1946, Longanesi moved to Milan with his family, while his parents moved to Imola. Shortly after, Longanesi accepted an offer from industrialist Giovanni Monti and founded the publishing house Longanesi & Co. on 1 February 1946 and simultaneously published Il Libraio, a bibliographic magazine, from 1946 to 1949. Politically, Longanesi became a prominent opponent of the new republican democracy that replaced Fascism, stating that,

In his pieces, he pokes fun both at anti-fascists ("There is who believe to be an anti-fascist only because Fascism never noticed him") and ex-fascists reused in the new system ("There is a question we must never say, 'Where we have met before?'").

Longanesi was also a staunch anti-communist. During the 1948 election, fearing a victory of the Soviet-sponsored Popular Democratic Front, Longanesi and Montanelli campaigned for the "less worse" Christian Democracy (DC), printing and publishing pamphlets, fliers, posters and hosting Radio Garibaldi, an illegal FM transmission in Milan. After the defeat of the Front, Longanesi left Il Libraio, and in 1950 founded the magazine Il Borghese, collaborating with Montanelli, Giovanni Ansaldo, Giuseppe Prezzolini, Giovanni Spadolini, Alberto Savinio, Mario Tedeschi, Ennio Flaiano, Colette Rosselli, Irene Brin, Goffredo Parise, Mario Missiroli and Piero Buscaroli. In Longanesi's view, Il Borghese should be an expression of a new right-wing anti-communist movement, who he named "Brothers of Italy's League", and organized political circles in several cities. The movement grew rapidly, attracting both unsatisfied voters and those who had been excluded from the 1950s economic miracle, especially farmers. Longanesi and his followers feared that the new media culture and consumerism would destroy traditions, disfigure the Italian landscape and brutalize culture. They also criticized the nullification of classes. Longanesi was harshly critical of the government, calling it unable to balance old traditions and modernity, and of the democratic policy of universal suffrage, stating:

In the early 1950s, Longanesi tried to transform his movement into a large right-wing party, formed by former Fascists, monarchists, Catholics, liberals and conservatives. He also visited Achille Lauro, mayor of Naples and advocate of the Monarchist National Party, to convince him to join and finance the movement, but Lauro's refusal and Longanesi's lack of political ambition lead the project to fail. However, Longanesi still supported the idea of a national party, and in 1955 he organized a conference titled "What is the right[-wing] in Italy?".

His criticisms both of government and of neo-fascists led to his isolation. In 1956, Monti proposed separation between Il Borghese and Longanesi & Co., and Longanesi's refusal was used to justify ousting him from the administration council. Due to an unknown connection in Confindustria, as reported by Ansaldo, Longanesi was able to maintain Il Borghese by himself, paying ₤5,000,000. Ansaldo later always claimed that Monti's operation was forced by governing pressures, especially from President Giovanni Gronchi, a left-leaning Christian Democrat who personally disliked Longanesi and Il Borghese, and hoped that without money it would be closed and Longanesi ruined.

On 27 September 1957, Longanesi suffered a heart attack while in his office. It was reported that his last words were: "That is, exactly as I always hoped: quickly and among my things."

He died soon after being transported to a clinic. His death was grieved by his few living friends, including Benedetti; Montanelli, future founder of Il Giornale; and Spadolini, future first non-Christian Democrat Prime Minister of the Italian Republic.

Personal life
On 18 February 1939, shortly after the closure of Omnibus, Longanesi married Maria Spadini, daughter of Armando Spadini, whom he knew through Vincenzo Cardarelli, former L'Italiano journalist. In their marriage Longanesi had three children: Virginia (born 19 December 1939), Caterina (born 25 December 1941) and Paolo (born 6 April 1945).

While at home, Longanesi explored his passion for painting, causing some arguments with his wife for his surrealistic works. He believed in traditional and superstitious cures, such as using rabbit skin to treat sciatica.

Works

Books

Vade-mecum del perfetto fascista seguito da dieci assiomi per il milite ovvero Avvisi ideali (1926)
Cinque anni di rivoluzione (1927)
L'Almanacco di Strapaese, with Gino Maccari (1928)
Vecchio Sport (extract) (1935)Piccolo dizionario borghese, with Vitaliano Brancati (1941)Parliamo dell'elefante : frammenti di un diario (1947)In piedi e seduti (1919-1943) (1948)Il mondo cambia. Storia di cinquant'anni (1949)Una vita. Romanzo (1949)Il destino ha cambiato cavallo (1951)Un morto fra noi (1952)Ci salveranno le vecchie zie? (1953)L'onesto Signor Bianchi (1953)Lettera alla figlia del tipografo (1957)La sua signora. Taccuino di Leo Longanesi (1957)Me ne vado. Ottantun incisioni in legno (1957)L'italiano in guerra, 1915-1918 (1965, posthumous)I Borghesi Stanchi (1973, posthumous)Il Generale Stivalone (2007, posthumous)Faust a Bologna (2013, posthumous)Morte dell'Imperatore (2016, posthumous)

StageDue Servi, with Mino Maccari (1924)Una conferenza (1942)Il commendatore (1942)Il suo cavallo (1944)La colpa è dell'anticamera (1946)

Film
 Heartbeat, with Mario Camerini and Ivo Perilli (1939)Dieci minuti di vita, with Steno and Ennio Flaiano (uncompleted, 1943)Quartieri alti'', with Steno, Renato Castellani, Mario Soldati and Ercole Patti (1945)

Drawings
A gun aimed on Italy
Literary graphic (1)
Literary graphic (2)

Commercials
Supercortemaggiore (Agip)
Agipgas (Agip)
Vespa (Vespa)
Moto Guzzi (Moto Guzzi)
Adolph's (Adolph's)

Bibliography

References

Sources

1905 births
1957 deaths
People from Imola
Italian male journalists
20th-century Italian writers
20th-century Italian male writers
Italian memoirists
Conservatism in Italy
Italian magazine editors
Italian publishers (people)
Italian anti-communists
20th-century memoirists
Italian magazine founders